Homaroa is a genus of moths in the subfamily Lymantriinae. The genus was defined by Cyril Leslie Collenette in 1955. The species are found on Madagascar.

Afromoths gives this genus as a synonym of Sychnacedes Collenette, 1953.

Species
Homaroa brontonepha (Collenette, 1931)
Homaroa epiclithra Collenette, 1955
Homaroa frieda Collenette, 1959
Homaroa tamsi Collenette, 1959

References

Lymantriinae